Andrea Rooth (born 6 March 2002) is a Norwegian hurdler. She won gold in the 400m hurdles at the 2021 European Athletics U20 Championships, and has competed at the 2019 European Youth Summer Olympic Festival, 2019 Bislett Games, and was disqualified for a false start in the 100m hurdles at the 2022 European Athletics Championships.

Family background
She is related to the Rooth family of athletes from Oslo. 110m hurdles world record holder Colin Jackson is her godfather.

References

External links
 

Norwegian female sprinters
Norwegian female hurdlers
Norwegian heptathletes
Norwegian Athletics Championships winners
Living people
2002 births
Athletes from Oslo
21st-century Norwegian women